The arrondissement of Saint-Amand-Montrond is an arrondissement of France in the Cher department in the Centre-Val de Loire region. It has 116 communes.

Composition

The communes of the arrondissement of Saint-Amand-Montrond, and their INSEE codes, are:

 Ainay-le-Vieil (18002)
 Apremont-sur-Allier (18007)
 Arcomps (18009)
 Ardenais (18010)
 Arpheuilles (18013)
 Augy-sur-Aubois (18017)
 Bannegon (18021)
 Beddes (18024)
 Bessais-le-Fromental (18029)
 Blet (18031)
 Bouzais (18034)
 Bruère-Allichamps (18038)
 Bussy (18040)
 La Celette (18041)
 La Celle (18042)
 La Celle-Condé (18043)
 Chalivoy-Milon (18045)
 Chambon (18046)
 La Chapelle-Hugon (18048)
 Charenton-du-Cher (18052)
 Charly (18054)
 Châteaumeillant (18057)
 Châteauneuf-sur-Cher (18058)
 Le Châtelet (18059)
 Chaumont (18060)
 Le Chautay (18062)
 Chavannes (18063)
 Chezal-Benoît (18065)
 Cogny (18068)
 Colombiers (18069)
 Contres (18071)
 Cornusse (18072)
 Corquoy (18073)
 Cours-les-Barres (18075)
 Coust (18076)
 Crézançay-sur-Cher (18078)
 Croisy (18080)
 Cuffy (18082)
 Culan (18083)
 Drevant (18086)
 Dun-sur-Auron (18087)
 Épineuil-le-Fleuriel (18089)
 Farges-Allichamps (18091)
 Faverdines (18093)
 Flavigny (18095)
 Germigny-l'Exempt (18101)
 Givardon (18102)
 Grossouvre (18106)
 La Groutte (18107)
 La Guerche-sur-l'Aubois (18108)
 Ids-Saint-Roch (18112)
 Ignol (18113)
 Ineuil (18114)
 Jouet-sur-l'Aubois (18118)
 Lantan (18121)
 Lignières (18127)
 Loye-sur-Arnon (18130)
 Lugny-Bourbonnais (18131)
 Maisonnais (18135)
 Marçais (18136)
 Meillant (18142)
 Menetou-Couture (18143)
 Montlouis (18152)
 Morlac (18153)
 Mornay-Berry (18154)
 Mornay-sur-Allier (18155)
 Nérondes (18160)
 Neuilly-en-Dun (18161)
 Neuvy-le-Barrois (18164)
 Nozières, Cher (18169)
 Orcenais (18171)
 Orval (18172)
 Osmery (18173)
 Ourouer-les-Bourdelins (18175)
 Parnay (18177)
 La Perche (18178)
 Le Pondy (18183)
 Préveranges (18187)
 Raymond (18191)
 Reigny (18192)
 Rezay (18193)
 Sagonne (18195)
 Saint-Aignan-des-Noyers (18196)
 Saint-Amand-Montrond (18197)
 Saint-Baudel (18199)
 Saint-Christophe-le-Chaudry (18203)
 Saint-Denis-de-Palin (18204)
 Saint-Georges-de-Poisieux (18209)
 Saint-Germain-des-Bois, Cher (18212)
 Saint-Hilaire-de-Gondilly (18215)
 Saint-Hilaire-en-Lignières (18216)
 Saint-Jeanvrin (18217)
 Saint-Loup-des-Chaumes (18221)
 Saint-Maur (18225)
 Saint-Pierre-les-Bois (18230)
 Saint-Pierre-les-Étieux (18231)
 Saint-Priest-la-Marche (18232)
 Saint-Saturnin (18234)
 Saint-Symphorien (18236)
 Saint-Vitte (18238)
 Sancoins (18242)
 Saulzais-le-Potier (18245)
 Serruelles (18250)
 Sidiailles (18252)
 Tendron (18260)
 Thaumiers (18261)
 Torteron (18265)
 Touchay (18266)
 Uzay-le-Venon (18268)
 Vallenay (18270)
 Venesmes (18273)
 Vereaux (18275)
 Vernais (18276)
 Verneuil (18277)
 Vesdun (18278)
 Villecelin (18283)

History

The arrondissement of Saint-Amand-Montrond was created in 1800.

As a result of the reorganisation of the cantons of France which came into effect in 2015, the borders of the cantons are no longer related to the borders of the arrondissements. The cantons of the arrondissement of Saint-Amand-Montrond were, as of January 2015:

 Charenton-du-Cher
 Châteaumeillant
 Châteauneuf-sur-Cher
 Le Châtelet
 Dun-sur-Auron
 La Guerche-sur-l'Aubois
 Lignières
 Nérondes
 Saint-Amand-Montrond
 Sancoins
 Saulzais-le-Potier

References

Saint-Amand-Montrond